The Sunken Bell is an 1896 poetic play in blank verse by Gerhart Hauptmann.

The Sunken Bell may also refer to:
La campana sommersa or The Sunken Bell, a 1927 opera by Ottorino Respighi
Die versunkene Glocke (opera) or The Sunken Bell, an 1896 opera by Heinrich Zöllner
The Sunken Bell, an unfinished opera by Carl Ruggles
The Sunken Bell or Potonuvsky Kolokol, a 1900 opera by Alexei Davidov